The House at 6112 Carpenter Road is a single-family home located in Flint, Michigan. It was listed on the National Register of Historic Places in 1982.

The house was likely built some time between 1840 and 1860. It is an L-shaped Greek Revival structure. The main portion is two stories high and features corner
pilasters, a wide entablature, and a cornice with returns. The second section is one story high, and includes a porch with Classically detailed pillars. One notable feature of this house is its reduced dimensions: although maintaining the same proportions, it is smaller overall than similar homes in the area.

References

		
National Register of Historic Places in Genesee County, Michigan
Greek Revival architecture in Michigan
Buildings and structures in Flint, Michigan
Houses in Genesee County, Michigan